is a passenger railway station located in the city of Isumi, Chiba Prefecture Japan, operated by the East Japan Railway Company (JR East).

Lines

Station layout
Namihana Station has a single island platform connected to a white-washed station building. The station is unattended.

Platforms

History
Namihana Station was opened on 20 June 1913. The current station building dates from 1980. The station was absorbed into the JR East network upon the privatization of the Japan National Railways (JNR) on 1 April 1987.

Passenger statistics
In fiscal 2006, the station was used by an average of 96 passengers daily.

Surrounding area
 
Namihana post office

See also
 List of railway stations in Japan

References

External links

 JR East Station information  

Railway stations in Japan opened in 1913
Railway stations in Chiba Prefecture
Sotobō Line
Isumi